The 2001–02 season was the 93rd year of football played by Dundee United, and covers the period from 1 July 2001 to 30 June 2002. United finished the season in eighth place.

United were knocked out of both domestic cup competitions in the quarter-finals stages, losing to Hibernian in the Tennent's Scottish Cup and to Ayr United in the CIS Insurance Cup.

Match results
Dundee United played a total of 45 competitive matches during the 2001–02 season. The team finished eighth in the Scottish Premier League.

In the cup competitions, United were knocked out of the CIS Cup at the quarter-finals stage, losing to Hibernian. Ayr United knocked United out of the Scottish Cup at the same stage. Both matches finished 2–0, although Ayr United won in a replay after a 2–2 draw.

Legend

All results are written with Dundee United's score first.

Bank of Scotland Premierleague

Tennent's Scottish Cup

CIS Insurance Cup

United beat St Johnstone after extra time

Player details
During the 2001–02 season, United used 29 different players, with a further two named as substitutes who did not make an appearance on the pitch. The table below shows the number of appearances and goals scored by each player.

|}

Goalscorers
Twelve players scored for the United first team with the team scoring 53 goals in total. Steven Thompson was the top goalscorer, scoring ten goals.

Discipline
During the 2001–02 season, five United players were sent off, and 17 players received at least one yellow card. In total, the team received five dismissals and 68 cautions.

Team statistics

League table

Transfers

In
Three players were signed during the 2001–02 season, with a total (public) transfer cost of around £150,000. One player was also signed for the following season. In addition, one player was signed on loan.

The players that joined Dundee United during the 2001–02 season, along with their previous club, are listed below.

Loans in

Out
Ten players left the club during the season with only one transfer - Sean O'Connor to Queen of the South - bringing in a fee (£10k). Six players were also loaned out during the season.

Listed below are the players that were released during the season, along with the club that they joined. Players did not necessarily join their next club immediately.

Loans out

Playing kit

The jerseys were sponsored by Telewest for the penultimate time.

Awards
Alex Smith
Scottish Premier League Manager of the Month: 1
 January 2002

Stuart Duff
Scottish Premier League Young Player of the Month: 1
 April 2002

See also
2001–02 Scottish Premier League
2001–02 Scottish Cup
2001–02 in Scottish football

Trivia
Jim Hamilton became the first player in Scottish football to successfully use video evidence to overturn a sending off. Hamilton received a red card against St Johnstone on 16 November but had it rescinded a week later.

References

External links
Official site: 2001/02 Results
Soccerbase
Results
Squad stats
Transfers

2001-02
Scottish football clubs 2001–02 season